Huachi County is a county in the east of Gansu province, China, bordering Shaanxi province to the north and northeast. It is under the administration of the prefecture-level city of Qingyang. Its postal code is 745600, and its population in 2018 was 138,680 people. Huachi has a low population density and is one of the poorer counties of China, partly because of the dry climate.

Parts of the Qin Great Wall run through Huachi. Huachi was established as a county during the Western Wei dynasty. During the Five Dynasties period it was abolished, becoming part of neighbouring counties. In 1934 it was re-established. During the first encirclement campaign against the Shaanxi–Gansu Soviet it was home to the Nanliang communist base.

Huachi's important agricultural produce includes white melon seeds, daylily, wood ear mushroom and millets.

Administrative divisions
Huachi County is divided to 6 towns and 9 townships.
Towns

Townships

Climate

See also
 List of administrative divisions of Gansu

References

External links 
 Official website (Chinese)
Huachi County Museum

 
Huachi County
Qingyang